Floyd Wagstaff (January 8, 1911 – February 5, 2000) was an American football and basketball coach. He coached Tyler Junior College from 1946 to 1975 and served as athletic director until retiring in 1984. He led the Apaches to national basketball championships in 1949 and 1951, and a record 11 NJCAA national tournament appearances. Wagstaff compiled 734–221 record as Tyler basketball coach. He also was 130–36 as Tyler football coach.

Wagstaff is a member of the Texas Sports Hall of Fame and the Stephen F. Austin University Hall of Fame.

1911 births
2000 deaths
Basketball coaches from Texas
People from Shelby County, Texas
Stephen F. Austin Lumberjacks football players
Tyler Junior College alumni
High school football coaches in Texas
Tyler Apaches football coaches
Junior college men's basketball coaches in the United States